Henry W. Rothert (11 September 1840 – 29 January 1920) was an American politician.

Rothert was of German descent, born to parents John H. and Margaret Rothert on 11 September 1840. The family resided in Cincinnati, Ohio. After Rothert graduated from high school there, he joined his brothers' hardware business. The Rotherts opened a branch in Keokuk, Iowa, in 1858, and Henry moved west to manage it. Rothert was a Republican. He was elected an alderman of Keokuk in 1868, and served through 1871, when he was elected mayor of the city. Rothert was reelected to the mayoralty the next year, and subsequently contested the 1873 Iowa Senate election. Rothert sat in the Iowa Senate until 1878, representing District 1. He was president pro-tempore of the senate, and was duly elevated to acting lieutenant governor upon the ascension of Joshua G. Newbold to the governorship as Samuel J. Kirkwood took office in the United States Senate. Rothert was named register of the land office in Cheyenne, Wyoming, and held the position for approximately four years. In the same year that he had accepted the Wyoming post, Rothert contested the state senate seat he had once held. He won the 1881 election and served through 1886.

In later life, Rothert focused on the field of education. He had previously served nine years on the Keokuk school board, and after he raised a deaf son, accepted the superintendency of the Iowa School for the Deaf in 1887. Rothert resigned the position in August 1919, and remained in Council Bluffs, where he died on 29 January 1920.

References

1920 deaths
American people of German descent
Mayors of places in Iowa
Iowa city council members
School board members in Iowa
Businesspeople from Cincinnati
Politicians from Cincinnati
People from Keokuk, Iowa
School superintendents in Iowa
19th-century American educators
20th-century American educators
19th-century American politicians
Republican Party Iowa state senators
Businesspeople from Iowa
19th-century American businesspeople
Politicians from Council Bluffs, Iowa
1840 births